Kilmuir (Gaelic: Cill Mhoir or Cille Mhoire) is the name of a number of settlements in Scotland:
Kilmuir, Skye, on the Trotternish peninsula
Kilmuir, Black Isle, near North Kessock and Inverness, in the historic parish of Kilmuir Wester
Kilmuir, Easter Ross, near Kildary and Invergordon, in the historic parish of Kilmuir Easter
Kilmuir, Duirinish, an area of Dunvegan, on Skye